Linda Lee Gustavson (born November 30, 1949), also known by her married name Linda McGuire, is an American former competition swimmer, three-time Olympic medalist, and surpassed world record-holder in two events.  As an 18-year-old, she was on the United States Olumpic team at the  1968 Summer Olympics in Mexico City, a medalist in the three events she competed in.

Career
Gustavson was a product of the powerhouse training program at the Santa Clara Swim Club, led by coach George Haines.  The club trained U.S. Olympic level swimmers during the 1960s and 1970s, including eight men and eight women of the 1968 U.S. Olympic swimming team.

She received a gold medal as a member of the first-place U.S. team in the women's 4×100-meter freestyle relay (4:02.5).  Together with her teammates Jane Barkman, Sue Pedersen and Jan Henne, she set a new Olympic record of 4:02.5 in the event final.  In individual competition, she also won a silver medal in the 400-meter freestyle (4:35.5), and a bronze medal in the 100-meter freestyle (1:00.3).

Gustavson attended Michigan State University with fellow Olympic swimmer Pam Kruse, and the two friends joined Kappa Alpha Theta sorority.  She swam for the Michigan State Spartans swimming and diving team in Association for Intercollegiate Athletics for Women (AIAW) and Big Ten Conference competition, and she and Kruse won the Big Ten championship in the 400-yard freestyle relay in 1971.  Gustavson graduated from Michigan State in 1972.

See also

 List of Michigan State University people
 List of Olympic medalists in swimming (women)
 World record progression 200 metres freestyle
 World record progression 4 × 100 metres freestyle relay

References

External links
 

1949 births
Living people
American female freestyle swimmers
World record setters in swimming
Michigan State Spartans women's swimmers
Olympic bronze medalists for the United States in swimming
Olympic gold medalists for the United States in swimming
Olympic silver medalists for the United States in swimming
Sportspeople from Santa Cruz, California
Swimmers at the 1967 Pan American Games
Swimmers at the 1968 Summer Olympics
Medalists at the 1968 Summer Olympics
Pan American Games gold medalists for the United States
Pan American Games medalists in swimming
Universiade medalists in swimming
Universiade gold medalists for the United States
Medalists at the 1967 Summer Universiade
Medalists at the 1967 Pan American Games